HD 209458 is an 8th-magnitude star in the constellation Pegasus. It is a G0V star, and is thus very similar to the Sun. Because it is located at a distance of about 159 light years, it is not visible to the unaided eye. With good binoculars or small telescope it should be easily detectable.

In 1999, two teams working independently (one team consisted of astronomers at the Geneva Observatory, the Center for Astrophysics  Harvard & Smithsonian, and the Wise Observatory; the second group was the California and Carnegie Planet Search team) discovered an extrasolar planet orbiting the star by using the radial velocity planet search method. Soon after the discovery, separate teams led by David Charbonneau and Gregory W. Henry were able to detect a transit of the planet across the surface of the star making it the first known transiting extrasolar planet. The planet received the designation HD 209458 b.

Because the planet transits the star, the star is dimmed by about 2% every 3.5 days making it an extrinsic variable. The variable star designation for HD 209458 is V376 Pegasi. It is the prototype of the variable class "EP" in the General Catalogue of Variable Stars, defined as stars showing eclipses by their planets.

Planetary system
HD 209458 b is an extrasolar planet that orbits the Sun-like star HD 209458 in the constellation Pegasus.  Spectroscopic studies first revealed the presence of a planet around HD 209458 on November 5, 1999. The planet is now under even more public scrutiny with the announcement that its atmosphere contains water vapor.  Astronomers had made careful photometric measurements of several stars known to be orbited by planets, in the hope that they might observe a dip in brightness caused by the transit of the planet across the star's face.  This would require the planet's orbit to be inclined such that it would pass between the Earth and the star, and previously no transits had been detected.

Travis Barman at Lowell Observatory in Flagstaff, Arizona analyzed the emission spectrum of this planet in 2009, and believes that its atmosphere contains water, although previous research in 2007 suggests that the atmosphere is composed mostly of silicate clouds. The spectrum taken in 2020 did indeed feature either sodium or vanadium oxide, but not the water. Later study in 2021 did not find any planetary atmosphere at all.

References

External links
 

209458
108859
Pegasus (constellation)
Planetary transit variables
Planetary systems with one confirmed planet
G-type main-sequence stars
Pegasi, V376
Durchmusterung objects
J22031077+1853036